George D. Fisher (July 9, 1924 – December 20, 2014) was an American college basketball coach and athletic administrator at Austin Peay State University in Clarksville, Tennessee.  Fisher, a native of Greenbrier, Tennessee, also attended Austin Peay and played baseball, basketball and football at the school.  In 1962, he was named head basketball coach at his alma mater, where he shepherded the program into Division I status and coached the first African-American player in school history.

Following the close of his coaching career, Fisher became the Athletic director at the school and served in this capacity until 1977.

References

1924 births
2014 deaths
American men's basketball players
Austin Peay Governors athletic directors
Austin Peay Governors baseball players
Austin Peay Governors men's basketball coaches
Austin Peay Governors men's basketball players
Austin Peay Governors football coaches
Austin Peay Governors football players
Basketball coaches from Tennessee
Basketball players from Tennessee
People from Greenbrier, Tennessee